Qerveh (also Romanized as Qorveh; also known as Farvah, Ghorveh, Quenveh, and Qurveh) is a village in Howmeh Rural District of the Central District of Abhar County, Zanjan province, Iran. At the 2006 National Census, its population was 2,772 in 720 households. The following census in 2011 counted 2,640 people in 781 households. The latest census in 2016 showed a population of 2,686 people in 871 households; it was the largest village in its rural district.

Qerveh is one of the oldest villages in Abhar County. This area has more than three thousand years of history, leaving some remains: the old house built on cliff, the Imam Zadeh abol kheirebne mosabne jafar (امامزاده ابوالخیر بن موسی بن جعفر) and the old Sadat cemetery which has two young martyrs (Who has died in war against enemy): Seyed Abdol Karim ebne Saeed (سید عبد الکریم ین سعید) and Hossein ebne Rostam (حسین بن رستم). The Gherveh Spacious Mosque is here and the entrance bridge which has the Ahura Mazda logo on it.

Economic resources 
The main source of income for villagers is through agriculture , farming and horticulture. Agricultural products include grapes, walnuts, almonds and tomatoes.

References 

Abhar County

Populated places in Zanjan Province

Populated places in Abhar County